Chowchik Ab (also Romanized as Chowchīk Āb; also known as Emāmzādeh-ye Chechīk Āb and Emāmzādeh-ye Chowchīk Āb) is a village in Shoqan Rural District, Jolgeh Shoqan District, Jajrom County, North Khorasan Province, Iran. At the 2006 census, its population was 5, in 5 families.

References 

Populated places in Jajrom County